San Agustín is a city in the center-west of the province of Córdoba, Argentina. It lies on National Route 36, about 60 km south from the provincial capital Córdoba. The area has been used as a special stage in the 2014 Rally Argentina.

References
 
 Municipality of San Agustín — Official website.

Populated places in Córdoba Province, Argentina
Rally Argentina